Ajmer is a tehsil in Ajmer district of Rajasthan state in India. It consists of 4 census towns and 85 villages. The capital of the tehsil is the eponymous Ajmer.

History 
Before the formation of the Republic of India, the territory of present-day Ajmer tehsil was part of the former Ajmer-Merwara Province (also called Ajmer-Merwara-Kekri). In 1950, Ajmer province became a "Part C" state, and subsequently merged into Rajasthan state in 1956. Following the merger, the new district of Ajmer was constituted which included the territory of present-day Ajmer tehsil.

Geography
The tehsil consists of 4 census town's and 85 villages.

Census town
Pushkar Municipality
Ajmer Municipality
Badlya
Boraj-Kazipura

Villages
Ajaysar
Akhri
Amba Maseena
Aradka
Babayacha
Badiya Ka Bala
Baghpura
Balwanta
Banseli
Bargaon
Beer
Bhanwta
Bhawani Khera
Bhoodol
Bubani 
Chachiyawas
Chandiyawas
Chawandiya
Chhatri
Danta
Danta, Gegal
Daurai
Dedula
Deo Nagar
Doomara
Doongariya Khurd
Gagwana
Ganahera
Gegal
Ghooghra
Godiyawas
Goyala
Gudha
Gudha, Kadel
Gudli
Guwardi
Hansiyawas
Hathi Khera
Hatoondi
Hokaran
Hoshiyara
Jatiya
Jatli
Kadel
Kaklana
Kawalai
Kayampura
Kayar
Khajpura
Kharekhari
Khonda
Khori
Kishanpura
Lachchipura
Ladpura
Leela Seori
Leswa
Lohagal
Madarpura
Magra
Magri
Majhewla
Makarwali
Manpura
Miyapur
Muhami
Naharpura
Nand
Nareli
Narwar
Nolkha
Oontra
Padampura
Palra
Pushkar
Ramner Dhani
Rampura Nand
Rasoolpura
Rewat
Saradhana
Sarana
Sedariya
Somalpur
Tabeeji
Tilora

References

Tehsils of Rajasthan
Tehsils of Ajmer district